Haijian 51 is a China Marine Surveillance (CMS) ship in the 5th Marine Surveillance Flotilla of the East China Sea Fleet. She was christened and commissioned on November 11, 2005 at her 5th Marine Surveillance Flotilla's dock in Shanghai. The first captain was He Xuming.

Haijian 51 was renamed CCG-2151 in July 2013, under a unified, newly established China Coast Guard, integrating the former China Marine Surveillance, China Fishery Authority, General Administration of Customs, Public Security Border Troops.

Cruise operations 
CCG-2151 has been frequently involved in law enforcement patrol operations in waters around Diaoyu Islands.

References

Ships of the China Marine Surveillance